Johan George Betrem (1899 in The Hague – 1980) was a Dutch entomologist and phytopathologist who worked in Java from 1930–1945.
He is best known for his work on Scoliidae (Betrem J.G., 1928. Monographie der Indo-Australischen Scoliiden mit zoogeographischen Betrachtungen. Treubia 9 (suppl. Vol.) 388 pp., 5 pls.)

External links
GAP

References
 Achtenberg, K (1982). Johan George Betrem (1899–1980). Sphecos 5: 15-18.

Dutch entomologists
1980 deaths
1899 births
20th-century Dutch zoologists
Dutch people of the Dutch East Indies